Local elections were held in Malta on 11 April 2015.

In these local elections, 16-year-olds were allowed to vote for the first time. The voting age for parliamentary elections remained at 18.

Results

References

2015 elections in Europe
2015 in Malta
2015
April 2015 events in Europe